American actress Meryl Streep has been recognized with multiple awards and nominations for her work on screen and stage, including being one of few individuals to be nominated for both the Triple Crown of Acting and EGOT. She holds the record for the most Academy Award nominations of any actor, having been nominated twenty-one times — seventeen for Best Actress, and four for Best Supporting Actress — since the first nomination in 1978 for her performance in The Deer Hunter. She has won three times for her work in Kramer vs. Kramer (1980), Sophie's Choice (1983), and The Iron Lady (2012), making her the fifth actor to win three competitive acting Academy Awards. In 2009, Streep became the most-nominated performer in the Golden Globe Awards history when her Best Actress nominations for Doubt and Mamma Mia! gave her twenty-three in total, surpassing Jack Lemmon’s previous record of 22. Three years later, she garnered her eighth win for The Iron Lady, more than any actors. At the 74th Golden Globe Awards, she was nominated for the record-breaking thirtieth time for her performance in Florence Foster Jenkins, and received the honorary Cecil B. DeMille Award.

With her fifteenth nomination for Florence Foster Jenkins in 2017, Streep ties with Judi Dench for the most-nominated actor at the British Academy Film Awards. She has won the award for Best Actress twice for her performances in The French Lieutenant's Woman (1982) and The Iron Lady (2012). For her work in The Hours, Streep received a Silver Bear for Best Actress at the 53rd Berlin International Film Festival, who later recognized her with an Honorary Golden Bear at their 62nd ceremony. In Italy, she consecutively won the David di Donatello for Best Foreign Actress in 1984 and 1985 for Falling in Love and Out of Africa. At the 1986 Valladolid International Film Festival, she received the award for Best Actress for her role in Heartburn. Her portrayal as Lindy Chamberlain in Evil Angels earned her a Cannes Film Festival Award and AACTA Award for Best Actress, both in 1989.

In 1976, Streep won the Outer Critics Circle Award for Outstanding Performance for her stage debut in Trelawny of the "Wells" and Tennessee Williams' 27 Wagons Full of Cotton. The latter work also earned her nominations for Best Actress at the Drama Desk and Tony Award. The following year, she was a double nominee at the Drama Desk Award for the featured role in The Cherry Orchard and starred in the musical Happy End. Streep won an Emmy Award for Outstanding Lead Actress – Miniseries or a Movie for her roles in the miniseries Holocaust (1978) and Angels in America at the 2004 Ceremony. She also won Primetime Emmy Award for Outstanding Narrator for her work on documentary Five Came Back at the 69th Primetime Emmy Awards in 2017.

In 1983, Yale University, from which Streep graduated in 1975, awarded her an Honorary Degree, a Doctorate of Fine Arts. The first university to award her an Honorary Degree was Dartmouth College, where she spent time as a transfer student in 1970, in 1981. In 1998, Women in Film awarded Streep with the Crystal Award, an honor for outstanding women who, through their endurance and the excellence of their work, have helped to expand the role of women within the entertainment industry. The same year, she received a star on the Hollywood Walk of Fame. In 1999, she was awarded a George Eastman Award, given by George Eastman House for distinguished contribution to the art of film. In 2003, Streep was awarded an Honorary César by the French Académie des Arts et Techniques du Cinéma. In 2004, at the Moscow International Film Festival, she was honored with the Stanislavsky Award for the outstanding achievement in the career of acting and devotion to the principles of Stanislavsky's school. Also in 2004, she received the AFI Life Achievement Award. In 2008, Streep was inducted into the New Jersey Hall of Fame. In 2009, she was awarded an honorary Doctorate of Fine Arts by Princeton University. In 2010, she was awarded the National Medal of Arts, elected to the American Academy of Arts and Letters, and was awarded an honorary Doctor of Arts degree by Harvard University. On December 4, 2011, Streep, along with Neil Diamond, Yo-Yo Ma, Sonny Rollins, and Barbara Cook, received the 2011 Kennedy Center Honor. On February 14, 2012, Streep received the Honorary Golden Bear at the 62nd Berlin International Film Festival. In 2014, she was awarded the Presidential Medal of Freedom.

Major awards

Academy Awards

British Academy Film Awards

César Awards

Golden Globe Awards

Grammy Awards

Primetime Emmy Awards

Screen Actors Guild Awards

Tony Awards

Miscellaneous awards

State and academic honours

See also
 Meryl Streep on screen and stage
 List of Academy Award records
 List of actors with two or more Academy Awards in acting categories
 List of actors with two or more Academy Award nominations in acting categories
 List of actors with Academy Award nominations
 List of stars on the Hollywood Walk of Fame
 List of actors with Hollywood Walk of Fame motion picture stars
 List of Yale University people
 Triple Crown of Acting
 List of EGOT winners

Notes

References

External links
 

Awards and nominations
Lists of awards received by American actor